National Tertiary Route 503, or just Route 503 (or ) is a National Road Route of Costa Rica, located in the Heredia province.

Description
In Heredia province the route covers San Rafael canton (San Rafael, Santiago districts), San Pablo canton (San Pablo district).

References

Highways in Costa Rica